The Inevitable Defeat of Mister & Pete is a 2013 American drama film directed by George Tillman Jr. and written by Michael Starrbury. The film stars Anthony Mackie, Adewale Akinnuoye-Agbaje, Jennifer Hudson, Jordin Sparks and Jeffrey Wright. It is a coming-of-age story about two inner-city youths, who are left to fend for themselves over the summer after their mothers are taken away by the authorities. Skylan Brooks and Ethan Dizon star in the title roles as Mister and Pete, respectively.

Plot 

During a sweltering summer in New York City, 13-year-old Mister's (Skylan Brooks) hard-living mother (Hudson) is apprehended by the police, leaving the boy and nine-year-old Pete (Dizon) alone to forage for food while dodging police and various hostile residents while awaiting a child actor casting call. Faced with more than any child can be expected to bear, the resourceful Mister nevertheless feels he is an unstoppable force against seemingly immovable obstacles. But what really keeps the pair in the survival game is Mister's intelligence and perseverance.

Cast 
 Skylan Brooks as Mister 
 Ethan Dizon as Pete
 Anthony Mackie as Kris
 Adewale Akinnuoye-Agbaje as Pike
 Jennifer Hudson as Gloria
 Jordin Sparks as Alice
 Jeffrey Wright as Henry
 Julito McCullum as Dip Stick
 Adam Trese as Alice's Boyfriend
 Michael Chmiel as Clerk
 Chandler Frantz as Paul Finch-Audition Boy
 Marcus Carl Franklin as College Kid

Production 
In July 2012 Jennifer Hudson and Jordin Sparks joined the cast. In May 2013 CodeBlack Entertainment acquired the US rights for the distribution of the film.

Release 
On August 1, 2013 Lionsgate announced the limited release date October 11, 2013 for the film.

Reception

Box office 
In its opening weekend, the film opened in 147 theaters in the United States and Canada and grossed $254,279, ranking #24 at the box office. Mister & Pete was in release for 3 weeks and has grossed $494,608 domestically.

Critical 
On review aggregator Rotten Tomatoes, the film holds an approval rating of 86% based on 37 reviews, with an average rating of 6.85/10. The website's critics consensus reads: "The Inevitable Defeat of Mister & Pete uses its compelling streetwise setting -- and powerful performances from its young leads -- to offer a refreshing twist on the coming-of-age formula." On Metacritic, the film has a weighted average score of 61 out of 100, based on 16 critics, indicating "generally favorable reviews".

Accolades

See also 
 List of hood films

References

External links
 

2013 films
Films shot in New York City
Films set in Brooklyn
Lionsgate films
Films directed by George Tillman Jr.
Films produced by Robert Teitel
Films about heroin addiction
Films about child abuse
American buddy drama films
Films scored by Mark Isham
Hood films
2010s gang films
2013 drama films
2010s English-language films
2010s American films